Biljana Topić  Mitrović, (born 17 October 1977) is a Serbian former track and field athlete who achieved her best results in triple jump, having switched from sprint disciplines in which she had competed in early in her career. She competed at three Olympic Games (4 × 100 m relay in 2000 and triple jump in 2008 and 2012).

Topić holds Serbian national records in both indoor and outdoor triple jump and as part of the 4 × 100 m relay national team.

Career
Topić competed at 2008 Summer Olympics, where she was 4 centimeters short of making the final. She also competed in two World Championships, one World Indoor Championship and two European Indoor Championships. Her best results were all achieved in 2009 — silver medal with new national record of 14.56 m at IAAF World Athletics Final, fourth place with then national record of 14.52 m in World Championships, and fourth place in European Indoor Championships.

Topić is the current holder of Serbian national records in both indoor and outdoor triple jump and as part of the 4 × 100 m relay national team.

Personal bests

Outdoor

Indoor

Achievements

Personal life
Her husband is famous Serbian former high jumper and national record holder Dragutin Topić, who was also her personal trainer. Their daughter, Angelina Topić is the current European U18 high jump champion and also holds the national record in high jump.

See also
 Serbian records in athletics

References

External links
 
 
 
 
  (archive)

1977 births
Living people
Sportspeople from Šabac
Serbian female triple jumpers
Olympic athletes of Serbia
Athletes (track and field) at the 2000 Summer Olympics
Athletes (track and field) at the 2008 Summer Olympics
Athletes (track and field) at the 2012 Summer Olympics